The Rainbow Warrior (sometimes called The Sinking of the Rainbow Warrior) is a 1993 made-for-television drama film directed by Michael Tuchner and starring Jon Voight and Sam Neill.

Plot summary
The film is based on the true story of the Greenpeace ship Rainbow Warrior, which was sunk in Waitematā Harbour in Auckland, New Zealand on 10 July 1985 by French DGSE operatives, when it was preparing for a Pacific voyage to protest against French nuclear testing. The film chronicles the police investigation to discover what happened to the ship and who was responsible.

Cast
 Jon Voight as Peter Willcox
 Sam Neill as Alan Galbraith
 Bruno Lawrence as Terry Batchelor
 Kerry Fox as Andrea Joyce
 John Callen as David Lange
 Stacey Pickren as 
 Michael Mizrahi
 Tony Barry as Greenpeace activist
 Peter Hambleton as Maury Whitham
 Greg Johnson as Bert White
 Stephen O'Rourke as Eddie
 Stig Eldred as Steve Sawyer
 Lucy Lawless as Jane Redmond
 Dale Stevens as Amy
 Alison Bruce as Leslie Holbrook
 Mark Ferguson as Detective Neil Morris
 Nigel Harbrow as Fernando Pereira
 Bert Van Dijk as Bruno Ullman
 Joanna Briant as Detective Robin Borrie
 Clinton Ulyatt as Constable Adam Kelly
 Donogh Rees as Lab supervisor
 Bruce Phillips as Doctor Nicolas Legrange
 Bruce Allpress as Hec Crene
 Ken Blackburn as Gerard Curry
 Te Whatanui Skipwith as Rongelap man
 Martyn Sanderson as Uncle Emile
 Gerard Sanna as Andre Florian
 Patrice LeGrand as Antoine Riverol
 Simon Prast as Louis Deschamps
 Stephane Tyrode as Pierre Duval
 Serge Renault as Ouvea crewman #2
 Michael Cassin as Ouevea crewman #1
 Peter Hayden as Captain
 Jane Holland as Bartender
 John Sumner as Judge
 Grant Bridger as Police specialist
 Eru Potaka Dewes as Maori speaker
 Nicholas Rogers as Logger #1
 Lawrence Wharerau as Logger #2
 Nigel Godfrey as Yachtsman
 Peter Nicoll as Watchman #1
 Tim Cronin as Watchman #2
 Fritz Wollner as Greenpeace man
 Rachel Watkins as Newman's clerk
 Ruth Dudding as French reporter
 Nancy Schroder as Airline representative
 Stephen Hall as French naval officer
 Tony Hurst as Police diver
 Shannon Gray as Secretary

See also
 The Rainbow Warrior Conspiracy, miniseries
 Sinking of the Rainbow Warrior
 Rainbow Warrior Case (international law)
 List of films about nuclear issues

References

External links
 

1993 television films
1993 drama films
1993 films
Films directed by Michael Tuchner
Sinking of the Rainbow Warrior
Films about activists
New Zealand drama films
1990s English-language films